Time Boom X De Devil Dead is a 1987 studio album by Lee Perry and Dub Syndicate. It was re-released in 1994 by On-U Sound and in 2001 by EMI Records.

The album was something of a comeback for Perry.

Critical reception
Trouser Press wrote that "while perhaps lacking the eccentric edge of Perry’s own work, the LP is still weird and wonderful, a sample of some of the best avant-garde groove music being made today." Exclaim! called it Perry's best album of the 1980s. NME ranked it #34 on its "50 Best Albums of 1987" list.

First release
First release of the album was made in 1987.
Bass – Errol "Flabba" Holt
Drums – Lincoln "Style" Scott
Engineer – A.M. Sherwood, Derek Birket
Guitar – Bingy Bunny, Dwight Pinkney
Keyboards – Peter "Doctor Pablo" Stroud
Percussion – Bonjo Iyabinghi Noah
Piano – Steely
Saxophone – "Deadly" Headley Bennett
Artwork and sleeve concept – Lee Perry
Mastered by Kevin Metcalfe
Photography, artwork, sleeve design – Kishi

Side A
 "S.D.I." (6:27)
 "Blinkers" (4:58)
 "Jungle" (7:33) (Bass – Evar Wellington, guitar – Martin Frederix, keyboards – Kishi Yamamoto, vocals – Akabu)
 "De Devil Dead" (4:29) (Vocals – Akabu)

Side B
 "Music + Science Lovers" (5:05) (Bass – Doctor Pablo, guitar – Doctor Pablo)
 "Kiss the Champion" (7:13)
 "Allergic to Lies" (3:53) (Keyboards – Kishi Yamamoto)
 "Time Conquer" (4:31) (Guitar – Martin Frederix, keyboards – Kishi Yamamoto, piano – Kishi Yamamoto)

Second release
This release with electronic remixes was made in 1994 in On-U Sound.

 Bass – Errol "Flabba" Holt
 Bass, Guitar, Keyboards – Doctor Pablo
 Drums – Style Scott
 Guitar – Bingy Bunny, Dwight
 Keyboards – Kishi Yamamoto (tracks: 3,7,8,9,10)
 Percussion – Bonjo Iyabinghi Noah
 Piano – Steely
 Saxophone – "Deadly" Headley Bennett
 Vocals – Akabu (tracks: 3,4,9,10)

 "S.D.I." (6:27)
 "Blinkers" (4:58)
 "Jungle" (7:33) (Bass – Evar Wellington, guitar – Martin Frederix)
 "De Devil Dead" (4:29)
 "Music & Science Lovers" (5:05)
 "Kiss the Champion" (7:13)
 "Allergic to Lies" (3:53)
 "Time Conquer" (4:31) (Guitar – Martin Frederix)
 "Jungle (Original 7" Version)" (3:46)
 "Jungle (Wall Of China)" (2:52)
 "Night Train" (3:04)

Third release

References

1987 albums
Lee "Scratch" Perry albums
Albums produced by Lee "Scratch" Perry
Dub albums
On-U Sound Records albums